Arrow Glacier is located near the summit of Mount Kilimanjaro in Tanzania, on the west slope of the peak and is a small remnant of an icecap which once crowned the summit of Mount Kilimanjaro. Arrow Glacier is adjacent to a climbing route known as the Western Breach/Arrow Glacier Route or more commonly, the Lemosho Route. Arrow Glacier is a recently named glacial remnant that may not even exist as of 2011. It was what remained of an earlier glacier known as the Little Barranco Glacier.

See also
Retreat of glaciers since 1850
List of glaciers in Africa

References

Glaciers of Tanzania